Maduluwawe Sobitha Thero (29 May 1942 –  6 November 2015) was an influential Sinhalese Buddhist monk regarded for his nonviolent revolutionary leadership in Sri Lanka and the chief incumbent of the Kotte Naga Vihara. He was a prominent social-political activist, an independent thinker who endured to improve the positive and constructive aspects of Sri Lankan Politics.

Personal life
The Thero was born on 29 May 1942, the Vesak day at the village of Maduluwewa in Padukka, Homagama as Pathirage Don Rathnasekara. He received his  education at Maduluwawe Maha Vidyalaya and began to live in the temple when he was 11 in Padukka, under the guidance of his uncle, the head monk. He was ordained a novice monk on the 9th May 1955 at the Kotte Sri Naga Viharaya. In 1962, the Thero received his higher ordination after studying at the Vidyodaya and Vidyalankara Pirivenas and received his honorary doctorate from the University of Sri Jayewardenepura in 1964. In 1967, the Thero became the chief incumbent of the Kotte Naga Viharaya.

The Thero died on 6 November 2015 at the Mount Elizabeth Hospital in Singapore.  He was 73 at the time of his death. The government announced a state funeral and a day of national mourning.

Social services
The Thero actively worked during his struggle against the then President J. R. Jayawardena's (in office: 1977-1988) social-political practices and the latter's efforts to centralize power within the presidency, and threats against freedom of expression, civil rights and the rule of law. Thero was one of the most important leaders of the anti-Indian intervention campaign in the late 1980s as well. He was an excellent orator in mobilizing the Sri Lankan populace across the spectrum. He put his charisma, influence and skill to maximum use in the fight through the National Movement for a Just Society (NMJS) to usher in a democratic government on 8 January 2015 by uniting a divided opposition and the trade unions, rights groups, artists, professionals and academia.

Sobitha Thero played a key role in bringing a new government to power in 2015 by defeating Mahinda Rajapaksa. He supported the common candidate Maithripala Sirisena for the presidency, and Ranil Wickremesinghe to form a new government and campaigned for the release of Sarath Fonseka. The Thero was an ardent campaigner against the executive presidential system of Sri Lanka and acquired a reputation for his stand on social justice and for educating the youth on the dangers of drugs and alcohol abuse. He promoted mutual respect and amity between the various religious and linguistic groups of the country.

See also
2015 Sri Lankan presidential election
New Democratic Front (Sri Lanka)
Athuraliye Rathana Thero

References

1942 births
2015 deaths
Sri Lankan Buddhist monks
Theravada Buddhist monks
Sri Lankan Theravada Buddhists
Sinhalese monks